This is a list of defunct airlines of Laos.

See also
 List of airlines of Laos
 List of airports in Laos

References

Laos
Airlines
Airlines, defunct
Airlines